Edward Metzger (born January 23, 1936) is an American actor and writer.
Metzger is known for portrayals of famous men in history. He has portrayed Albert Einstein live on stage for over 30 years in his one-man show, Albert Einstein: The Practical Bohemian. He also portrayed Ernest Hemingway in his live on stage performances of Hemingway: On The Edge. He researched and wrote both one-man stage shows together with his wife, Laya Gelff Metzger.

Ed Metzger studied with Lee Strasberg at the Actors Studio in New York, and had roles in a number of movies:
Reflections in a Golden Eye, Dog Day Afternoon, Car Wash, and Pups.

Ed Metzger also appeared with Al Pacino on stage in Bertolt Brecht's gangster play, The Resistible Rise of Arturo Ui, at Joe Papp's New York Shakespeare Festival.   On television, he had roles in Chris Rock's comedy series, Everybody Hates Chris and  Kojak.  He had a guest appearance on The Super Mario Bros. Super Show! as George Washington and einstein.

Ed Metzger played Theodore Roosevelt in the 2008 movie The Curious Case of Benjamin Button.

Filmography

External links

1936 births
American male film actors
20th-century American dramatists and playwrights
Living people
20th-century American male actors
21st-century American male actors